Khirpai H.S. Multipurpose School is one of the oldest school of sub-division Ghatal, situated at Khirpai Paschim Medinipur, West Bengal, India. It is a Higher Secondary School.

About School
The school follows the course curricula of West Bengal Board of Secondary Education (WBBSE) and West Bengal Council of Higher Secondary Education (WBCHSE) for Standard 10th and 12th Board examinations respectively.

See also
Education in India
List of schools in India
Education in West Bengal

References

External links

High schools and secondary schools in West Bengal
Schools in Paschim Medinipur district
1876 establishments in India
Educational institutions established in 1876